Heather Edelson (born April 4, 1981) is an American politician serving in the Minnesota House of Representatives since 2019. A member of the Minnesota Democratic–Farmer–Labor Party (DFL), Edelson represents District 50A in the western Twin Cities metropolitan area, which includes the city of Edina and parts of Hennepin County, Minnesota.

Early life, education, and career
Edelson was raised in north Minneapolis and attended Columbia Heights Public Schools. She attended the University of Minnesota, earning a M.S.W and was the first person from her family to graduate from college.

Edelson has worked as a mental health therapist, and served as a Guardian ad Litem in Hennepin County. She served on the Edina Public School Board Special Education Advisory Council, as well as the Edina Race and Equity Working Group. Edelson also served as the Human Rights and Relations Commissioner for Edina.

Minnesota House of Representatives
Edelson was elected to the Minnesota House of Representatives in 2018 and has been reelected every two years since. She first ran for the DFL party endorsement in 2016, losing to Ron Erhardt, an 11-term incumbent who switched from the Republican to the DFL party in 2010. Erhardt lost in the general election, and Edelson won the DFL endorsement in 2018, going on to defeat one-term Republican incumbent Dario Anselmo.

Edelson serves as vice chair of the Ways and Means Committee, and sits on the Education Finance, Environment and Natural Resources Finance and Policy, and Human Services Policy Committees. From 2021-22, she served as an assistant majority leader.

Edelson carried legislation that would raise the legal age of tobacco, e-cigarretes and vaping devices to 21, and has spoken in support of assisted-suicide legislation. She sponsored legislation to give grants to religious groups to increase security following a rise in anti-semitic attacks. Edelson worked on bipartisan legislation to fix the competency restoration program along with Republican Representative Tony Albright, adopting recommendations from a task force dealing with gaps in the system for those who are found to be incompetent to stand trial.

After concerns were raised over price and accessibility, Edelson authored a bill that would add the whole cannabis flower to the state's medical cannabis program, stating it would decrease reliance on painkillers and opiods. She also drafted a bill that would allow medical cannabis and CBD oil in schools for student's with a doctor's approval.

In 2022, Edelson successfully sponsored legislation that legalized food and beverages, including gummies, containing THC if it was derived from hemp. The legislation was enacted in part to address previously unregulated delta-8 THC products. It is unclear if leaders of the Minnesota Senate understood that this legislation would legalize products with delta-9 THC. Edelson stated she wrote the legislation to strengthen consumer protections in an emerging market, and that she would write bills to add additional requirements and work with local governments to help them regulate THC edibles.

Electoral history

Personal life
Edelson was raised agnostic but converted to Judaism. She is married to her husband, Brett, the CEO for UnitedHealthcare of MN, ND & SD. They have three children and reside in Edina, Minnesota.

References

External links

 Official House of Representatives website
 Official campaign website

1981 births
Living people
People from Edina, Minnesota
University of Minnesota alumni
Democratic Party members of the Minnesota House of Representatives
21st-century American politicians
21st-century American women politicians
Women state legislators in Minnesota
Jewish American state legislators in Minnesota